The band was formed by Jack Murphy, Josh Thexton, Josh Arter-Taylor, Ben Ford and Carlos Montero in early 2016 after changing direction from their previous project. Youth Killed It have played with bands Slaves (UK), Wonk Unit and The Sherlocks toured with the likes of The LaFontaines, MassMattiks, Goldie Lookin' Chain as well as making an appearance at the Camden Rocks, Isle of Wight Festival and Teddy Rocks Festivals. They signed to Rude Records in late 2016 after having released two counterpart EPs, Welcome To The Sad Boys Club and Welcome To The Happy Girls Club.

In 2017 the band compiled the two EP's to release their debut album ‘Modern Bollotics’ which saw single ‘Popstar’ get play-listed and shortly followed this up with stand-alone single ‘Islands’. The band swiftly followed up their debut with the full-length LP ‘What’s So Great, Britain?’ in 2018.

In June 2019, guitarist Carlos Montero left the band and was replaced by Danny de Ara Torres, drummer Ben Ford left the band to be replaced by Joel Mullin, and Joshua Arter-Taylor was replaced on guitars with Paul Gaul. The band have now parted ways with Rude Records to focus on being an independent band and releasing singles. In 2020 the band self released two singles 'Dad Dance Moves' and 'Muzzle Head' and in 2021: 'I Don't Care'. April 2022 saw the release of a new 4 track EP 'I'm a Believer, I just don't believe ya' which the band claim marks a new era for them.

Discography

Members

Current members
Jack Murphy - Vocals/Guitar/Production (2016–Present)
Danny de Ara Torres - Guitar (2019–Present)
Paul Gaul - Guitar (2021–Present)
Joel Mullin - Drums (2019–Present)

Past members
 Carlos Montero - Guitar (2016-2019)
 Ben Ford - Drums (2016-2019)
 Joshua Arter-Taylor - Guitar (2016-2020)
Josh Thexton - Bass/Vocals <small>(2016–2022)

Timeline

References 

British indie rock groups
Musical groups established in 2016
2016 establishments in England